Giulio Ugo Bisconcini (2 March 1880, Padua – 1969) was an Italian mathematician, known for his work on the three-body problem.

Education and career
Biscocini received his laurea in mathematics in 1901 at the University of Padua. In 1906 he was appointed an academic assistant in analytic and projective geometry at the University of Rome. He was also a professor ordinarius at the commercial institute "Luigi di Savoia - Duca degli Abruzzi" in Rome.  At the University of Rome he became a libero docente (lecturer) on rational mechanics, i.e. classical mechanics as a mathematical system based on axioms. At the beginning of his career he did research on number theory, but he soon began to specialize in rational mechanics. His research dealt with the classification of the types of holonomic systems and the three-body problem.

Bisconcini was one of the professors conducting the Università clandestina di Roma (1941–1943), which was organized by Guido Castelnuovo to teach secret university courses to Jews and disfavored opponents of fascism.

Bisconcini's work on the three-body problem
According to Daniel Buchanan:

According to June Barrow-Green:

References

1880 births
1969 deaths
20th-century Italian mathematicians